New Hampshire Route 142 (abbreviated NH 142) is a  north–south state highway in northern New Hampshire. The highway runs between Franconia in the White Mountains Region to Dalton in the upper Connecticut River valley.

The southern terminus of NH 142 is at the junction with New Hampshire Route 18 in Franconia. The highway winds north through Bethlehem and Whitefield, then turns northwest to Dalton. The northern terminus is in Dalton at New Hampshire Route 135, the Connecticut River Road.

Major intersections

References

External links

 New Hampshire State Route 142 on Flickr

142
Transportation in Grafton County, New Hampshire
Transportation in Coös County, New Hampshire